Chapelton railway station serves the hamlet of Chapelton, part of the civil parish of Tawstock in the English county of Devon.

History
The North Devon Railway opened through Chapelton on 1 August 1854 but there was only a goods siding at that time. A wooden platform was erected on the east side of the single track so passengers could use the trains from 8 June 1857. Trains called every day for a while but the from the following April they were reduced to just two days most weeks. By October they were calling on Fridays only until April 1860 when they stopped all together. A new stone platform was built and services resumed on 1 March 1875.

The line was doubled on 19 October 1890 so a second platform was built for the new northbound line. A signal box was built on the new platform behind which was the station's goods yard. Much of the freight traffic was timber from a sawmill that was opened in 1930. Much of the timber was sold to railway companies (who used it to build freight wagons) and coal mines (for pit props).

The goods yard was closed on 4 January 1965 and the signal box, which had mainly been opened only when goods trains were shunting, was closed on 26 January 1966. On 21 May 1971 the line was reduced to just a single track again.

Description 
The station is situated a little to the south of the hamlet of Chapelton alongside the A377 road. A footpath crosses the railway that leads to the minor road on the east side of the valley.

The single platform, which is long enough for a 7 coach train, is on the west side of the track. There is a car park, bike rack, and waiting shelter. The building on the disused platform opposite was built for the station master but is now in private use.

Services
All services at Chapelton are operated by Great Western Railway.

Community railway
The railway between Exeter and Barnstaple is designated as a community railway and is supported by marketing provided by the Devon and Cornwall Rail Partnership. The line is promoted as the Tarka Line.

References

Railway stations in Devon
Railway stations in Great Britain opened in 1857
Railway stations in Great Britain closed in 1860
Railway stations in Great Britain opened in 1875
Former London and South Western Railway stations
Railway stations served by Great Western Railway
Railway request stops in Great Britain
Low usage railway stations in the United Kingdom
1857 establishments in England
DfT Category F2 stations